Introducing the Vibrations is an album recorded by American saxophonist Ken McIntyre in 1976 for the SteepleChase label.

Reception

Allmusic awarded the album 3 stars stating "The leader is heard on one song apiece playing flute, bass clarinet, oboe and bassoon, and he uses the alto on two others. Surprisingly enough, all of the songs were written during the 1956-62 period (all but one are from the 1956-59), although most sound fairly adventurous on this interesting if not essential outing".

Track listing
All compositions by Ken McIntyre
 "Theme" - 8:27
 "Eileen" - 5:40
 "Shortie" - 5:34
 "Clear Eyes" - 8:20
 "Now Is the Time" - 5:42
 "Miss Priss" - 6:17

Personnel 
Ken McIntyre - alto saxophone, flute, bassoon, oboe, bass clarinet, percussion
Terumasa Hino - trumpet, flugelhorn, tambourine
Richard Harper - piano
Alonzo Gardner  - bass
Andrei Strobert - drums
Andy Vega - congas, percussion

References 

1977 albums
Makanda Ken McIntyre albums
SteepleChase Records albums